Bousteila is a commune and town in Mauritania. It is located in the Timbedra department within the south-eastern region of Hodh Ech Chargui. Mauritania's southern border with Mali is within 10 kilometres of Bousteila.

References

Communes of Mauritania

Populated places in Mauritania